Joshua Paul Mulvany (born 26 December 1988) is an English professional footballer who last played as a midfielder for KTP.

Career
Mulvany began his footballing career in the academies of Southampton, Wycombe Wanderers and Oxford United before signing for Southern League club Didcot Town in 2007.

In 2008, Mulvany played college soccer for Louisburg College, before moving to the Kentucky Wildcats in 2010.

In the winter of 2012, Mulvany signed for National League North side Oxford City. Mulvany made eight appearances during his time at the club.

In 2013, after a short spell with Ekenäs IF in the second half of 2012, Mulvany moved back to Finland and signed with KooTeePee. In 2014, Mulvany moved to KTP. Mulvany won the club's Player of the Year award as the club achieved promotion to the Veikkausliiga.

References

1988 births
Living people
Footballers from Oxford
English footballers
Association football midfielders
Scotland youth international footballers
England youth international footballers
Didcot Town F.C. players
Kentucky Wildcats men's soccer players
Ekenäs IF players
Oxford City F.C. players
FC KooTeePee players
Kotkan Työväen Palloilijat players
Ykkönen players
Veikkausliiga players
English expatriate footballers
Expatriate footballers in Finland
Louisburg Hurricanes men's soccer players
University of Kentucky alumni
English expatriate sportspeople in Finland